The following languages are listed  as unclassified by the Ethnologue (17th edition), though in their descriptions some are identified with an established family, or have been retired as spurious. Since the 15th edition, several other unclassified languages were found to be related to known languages once better data was collected, and some, such as Amikoana and Miarrã, were found to be spurious and their ISO codes were retired. (See spurious languages.) Languages which became extinct before 1950 are the purview of Linguist List and are being gradually removed from Ethnologue; they are listed as an addendum to this page.

There are 48 unclassified languages in the 25th edition of Ethnologue published in 2022.

Africa

 Bung language (Cameroon)
 Gail language (a cant of South Africa)
 Imeraguen language (Mauritania, Hassaniya-Soninke mix?) (retired)
 Kara language (Central African Republic, Central Sudanic)
 Kujarge language (Chad, Afroasiatic)
 Laal language (Chad, isolate?)
 Leti language (Cameroon)
 Lufu language (Nigeria, Southern Jukunoid)
 Cameroonian Luo language (Cameroon; not to be confused with the better-known Luo language)
 Nigerian Mawa language (Nigeria; not to be confused with the Chadian Mawa language)
 Rer Bare language (Ethiopia, unattested)
 Shabo language (Ethiopia)
 Weyto language (Ethiopia, unattested)
 Yeni language (Cameroon, Mambiloid)

Americas

North
 Haitian Vodoun Culture language (Haiti)
 Mangue language (Nicaragua) (Oto-Manguean)

South

Asia

 Bhatola language [btl] (does not exist, requesting ISO code be retired)
 Enggano language (Indonesia) (Austronesian) 
 Majhwar language (India, possible dialect of Asuri [Mundari])
 Malakhel language (Afghanistan) (code retired)
 Ná-Meo language (Vietnam, possibly from Guangxi) (ethnically Hmong, said to be East Hmongic)
 Warduji language [wrd] (Sanglechi) (code retired)
 Waxiang (China, mixed Xiang-Hmongic?)

Bhatola is listed as unclassifiable (due to a lack of data) by Glottolog.

Europe
All cants:
 Polari (United Kingdom)
 Quinqui (Spain)
 Traveller Scottish (United Kingdom)

Oceania
 Doso language (Papua New Guinea)
 Kembra language (Irian Jaya, Indonesia)
 Kimki language (Irian Jaya)
 Lepki language (Irian Jaya)
 Molof language (Irian Jaya)
 Murkim language (Irian Jaya)
 Namla language (Irian Jaya)
 Tofanma language (Irian Jaya)
 Usku language (Irian Jaya)
 Yetfa language (Irian Jaya)
 Yitha Yitha language (Australia) (Ethnologue has a Ngarinyeric-Yithayithic branch of Pama-Nyungan that Yitha Yitha is traditionally classified in)

Languages maintained by Linguist List
These languages became extinct before 1950 and their ISO codes are not, or are no longer, maintained by SIL. Maintenance of additional languages extinct before 1950 is being gradually shifted from SIL to Linguist List. 
Africa
 Meroitic language
America, North
 Adai language
 Aranama–Tamique language 
 Beothuk language
 Cayuse language 
 Solano language
 Timucua language
America, South
 Mochica language
 Puquina language
Asia
 

 Hunnic language
 Indus Valley language
 Kaskean language 
Anatolia
 Hattic language
 Mysian language 
Korea
 Kara language (Korea) 
 Koguryo language 
 Paekche language (incl. Puyo-Paekche)
 Puyo language 
 Puyo-Paekche language 
 Yemaek language
Europe
 Camunic language 
 Eteocretan language
 Eteocypriot language
 Iberian language
 Ligurian (ancient language)
 Linear A language (= Minoan)
 Minoan  language
 North Picene language
 Pictish language
 Raetic language
 Sicanian language
 Sorothaptic language 
 Tartessian language
Oceania
 Tambora language
 Tasmanian languages

References

External links
 Unclassified in 
 List from the Linguist List

Unclassified